William Johnson (1855 – May 20, 1903) was a United States Navy sailor and a recipient of America's highest military decoration, the Medal of Honor.

Biography
Willian Johnson was born in 1855 on Saint Vincent island in the West Indies.

On November 14, 1879, Johnson was serving as a Cooper on the steamship  at the Mare Island Naval Shipyard, California, when he "rescued Daniel W. Kloppen, a workman, from drowning." For his actions on that occasion, Cooper Johnson was awarded the Medal of Honor five years later, on October 18, 1884.

Johnson died at age 47 or 48 and was buried in Arlington National Cemetery, Arlington County, Virginia.

Medal of Honor citation
Rank and organization: Cooper, U.S. Navy. Born: 1855, St. Vincent West Indies. Accredited to: New York. G.O. No.: 326, October 18, 1884.

Citation
Citation: Serving on board the U.S.S. Adams at the Navy Yard, Mare Island, Calif., 14 November 1879, Johnson rescued Daniel W. Kloppen, a workman, from drowning.

See also

List of Medal of Honor recipients
List of Medal of Honor recipients during Peacetime
List of African American Medal of Honor recipients

References

1855 births
1903 deaths
Saint Vincent and the Grenadines emigrants to the United States
United States Navy Medal of Honor recipients
United States Navy sailors
Burials at Arlington National Cemetery
Foreign-born Medal of Honor recipients
People from Saint Vincent (Antilles)
Non-combat recipients of the Medal of Honor